Mount Marion is a mountain located in the Catskill Mountains of New York north of Kingston.

References

Mountains of Ulster County, New York
Mountains of New York (state)